The 1989–90 season was Paris Saint-Germain's 20th season in existence. PSG played their home league games at the Parc des Princes in Paris, registering an average attendance of 17,397 spectators per match. The club was presided by Francis Borelli and the team was coached by Tomislav Ivić. Safet Sušić was the team captain.

Summary

The Parisians returned to their disappointing trend in 1989–90, finishing 5th in the league and putting up a bittersweet performance in the UEFA Cup. They barely defeated lowly Finish outfit Kuusysi in the first round but were then just one goal away from eliminating eventual champions Juventus in the second round. Pre-season saw PSG sign a deal with American sportswear brand Nike as their new kit manufacturer from this campaign onwards, while a young Daniel Bravo joined the club. He would go on to be one of the leading figures of PSG's golden generation in the 1990s. On the other hand, Jean-Marc Pilorget bid farewell after 14 years and a club record 435 appearances.

Players 
As of the 1989–90 season.

Squad

Out on loan

Transfers 

As of the 1989–90 season.

Arrivals

Departures

Kits 

French radio RTL and Japanese electronics company TDK were the shirt sponsors. American sportswear brand Nike was the kit manufacturer.

Friendly tournaments

Tournoi de Paris

Tournoi Indoor de Paris-Bercy

First group stage (Group B)

Second group stage (Winners Group)

Competitions

Overview

Division 1

League table

Results by round

Matches

Coupe de France

UEFA Cup

First round

Second round

Statistics 

As of the 1989–90 season.

Appearances and goals 

|-
!colspan="16" style="background:#dcdcdc; text-align:center"|Goalkeepers

|-
!colspan="16" style="background:#dcdcdc; text-align:center"|Defenders

|-
!colspan="16" style="background:#dcdcdc; text-align:center"|Midfielders

|-
!colspan="16" style="background:#dcdcdc; text-align:center"|Forwards

|-

References

External links 

Official websites
 PSG.FR - Site officiel du Paris Saint-Germain
 Paris Saint-Germain - Ligue 1 
 Paris Saint-Germain - UEFA.com

Paris Saint-Germain F.C. seasons
French football clubs 1989–90 season